The 2011–12 SIU Edwardsville Cougars men's basketball team represented Southern Illinois University Edwardsville during the 2011–12 NCAA Division I men's basketball season. The Cougars, led by fifth-year head coach Lennox Forrester, played their home games at the Vadalabene Center and competed for the first time as members of the Ohio Valley Conference.

Preseason
Six players returned from the 8–21 team of 2010–11. They were joined by four freshmen and three junior college transfers.

The OVC's pre-season coaches' poll picked SIUE to finish last in the Cougars' first season competing for the regular season title in the eleven team conference.   No Cougars were selected to the pre-season All-OVC team.

Season
After starting 0–4 in the Cancún Challenge, the Cougars won six conference games, including five of their last eight, and finished in ninth place.  Had they been eligible, they still would have failed to qualify for the eight team Ohio Valley Conference tournament.

Mark Yelovich was named to the All-Ohio Valley Conference second team, and Jerome Jones was on the All-Newcomer team.

While earning no post-season honors, freshman Kris Davis was twice named OVC Freshman of the Week and led the NCAA Division I in three point shooting percentage.

Roster
Source = 

† Sat out 2011–12 season due to NCAA Division I transfer rules
†† Sat out most of 2011–12 season as a medical redshirt

Schedule
Source = 

|-
!colspan=9  style="background:#CC0000; color:black;"|Exhibition

|-
!colspan=9  style="background:#CC0000; color:black;"|Regular Season

References

SIU Edwardsville Cougars men's basketball seasons
SIU Edwardsville
Edward
Edward